Whitworth was a civil parish in County Durham, in England, centred on Whitworth Hall.  It was one of several parishes abolished in 1937 to create the parish of Spennymoor.   Whitworth Hall (now a hotel) is on the road between Spennymoor and Brancepeth, and is close to Tudhoe. The house was in former times the home of the Shafto family, whose most famous member (from the 18th century) was Bobby Shafto, subject of a famous English nursery rhyme.

References 

Former civil parishes in County Durham